From the Ashes: Making Sense of Waco is a 1994 non-fiction anthology book edited by James R. Lewis about the Waco siege. It was published Rowman & Littlefield. The book contains 46 essays from people like Franklin Littell, Stuart A. Wright, David G. Bromley, Thomas Robbins, Dick Anthony, James A. Beckford, James T. Richardson, Dean M. Kelley, and Eldridge Cleaver. Some of the essays are scholarly articles, while others are opinion pieces. Other contents include press releases, personal correspondences, and a poem from a surviving Branch Davidian. Catherine Wessinger notes in her review of the book that it was a chance for new religious movement scholars to respond to the siege.

Reception 
H. Newton Malony for the International Journal for the Psychology of Religion called the book a "service" to the public for its compilation of materials and criticisms of the Cult Awareness Network's influence over the federal government during the Waco siege in particular. However, he criticized Lewis for having a biased perspective on the topic, specifically against the federal government's actions.

Catherine Wessinger for Nova Religio compliments the work for including military and law enforcement perspectives. She notes that essays by Robert D. Hicks and Charlie Beckwith are valuable, but one by Moorman Oliver, Jr., is "filled with incorrect allegations of fact".

Anson Shupe for the Journal for the Scientific Study of Religion criticizes the book for its strange colloquial tone which makes "metaphors and similes that at times border on the irresponsible" like comparing the Branch Davidians to the Holocaust or the Native American genocide, among other things. He also thinks the project was weakened by its improper timing – which prevented its contributors to use informative government reports – and the hyperbolic and ominous tone.

James A. Mathisen for Review of Religious Research criticized the work for not having a specific audience in mind when being edited together. He recommended libraries with smaller budgets to "wait for [Armageddon in Waco: Critical Perspectives on the Branch Davidian Conflict (1995)] to compare before" spending the money for only a few particularly good articles.

Blake W. Burleson for The San Francisco Jung Institute Library Journal believes that some of the contributors are like Carl Jung's "cultural enthusiasts" in that they exhibit "naïve belief in human innocence, or, in this case, religious innocence". He criticizes some contributors for going "great lengths" to defend David Koresh, leader of the Branch Davidians.

References 

1994 non-fiction books
1994 anthologies
Rowman & Littlefield books
Books about cults
Waco siege